Passo d'Areia ("sand place") is a bairro in the District of Sede in the municipality of Santa Maria, in the Brazilian state of Rio Grande do Sul. It is located in center-west Santa Maria.

Villages 
The bairro contains the following villages: Loteamento Roveda, Passo d'Areia, Vila Independência, Vila Marechal Mallet, Vila Oliveira.

Gallery of photos

References 

Bairros of Santa Maria, Rio Grande do Sul